Zinkia Entertainment (or simply Zinkia) is a Spanish production company located in Madrid, Spain. Its main focus is to create animated series for TV and games, for mobile devices and for game platforms. The company has more than 100 employees and their series have been sold in more than 95 countries worldwide. Zinkia was founded in 2001 by David Cantolla López and his brother Colman López, together with José María Castillejo as a capital partner.

History
In June 2006, one of its television series, Pocoyo, was awarded at the 30th International Festival of Annecy with the Cristal award for the "Best TV Series in the world" and a BAFTA prize in 2006.

In April 2011, Zinkia acquired a 51% majority stake in UK distributor Cake Entertainment.

After a bond issue failed, the company entered the red: in 2012 it carried out an ERE that affected a third of the workforce, and in 2013 it had to declare bankruptcy. In July 2014, Cake Entertainment's management purchased back Zinkia's 51% stake in Cake due to Zinkia's bankruptcy.

Zinkia managed to overcome this crisis thanks to Pocoyo's income, both in television rights and through its official YouTube channel. In 2016, it was acquired by the Mexican businessman Miguel Valladares, and since then it has focused exclusively on TV series animation.

Works
 Pocoyo (2005–present)
 Shuriken School (2006–2007) (co-production with Xilam)
 Mola Noguru (2013)

References

External links
 Company website

Companies based in Madrid
Spanish animation studios
Video game companies of Spain
Television production companies of Spain
Spanish companies established in 2001
Video game companies established in 2001
Mass media companies established in 2001